Friedrich Karl Alfred Schulze (20 April 1881 – 28 August 1960) was a German historian and director of the .

Life 
He then studied at the universities in Jena and Leipzig, initially classical and Germanic philology, then, due to a change in his interests, history, German studies and philosophy. In 1903, he was awarded the title Die Gräfin Dolores. Ein Beitrag zur Geschichte des deutschen Geisteslebens im Zeitalter der Romantik and was awarded a doctorate in philology. In 1904, followed the examination for the higher Lehramt. During his student days, he found his way into the Freistudentenschaft or the local "Finkenschaft". He worked as a writer for the Leipzig Freistudentenschaft and wrote numerous articles in the freestudent press.

From 1904 to 1906 he worked as an assistant teacher at the Königin-Carola-Gymnasium and Alte Nikolaischule (Leipzig)-Gymnasium in Leipzig. From 1906 to 1911, he worked for the B. G. Teubner Verlag, about which he published a work on the history of the company and wrote chapters I to V. From 1913; he was involved in the establishment of the newly founded city museum in Leipzig. Schulze was also active as a freelance writer and wrote, for example, articles for the Allgemeine Lexikon der Bildenden Künstler von der Antike bis zur Gegenwart.

When Albrecht Kurzwelly died in 1917 as a result of a war injury, Schulze took over his position as 2nd head of the board of the Stadtgeschichtliches Museum. In 1918, he took over the position of the museum director and was its director until 1945.

Schulze died in Halle at the age of 79.

Publications 
 
 
 
 
 Der deutsche Buchhandel und die geistigen Strömungen der letzten hundert Jahre. Verlag des Börsenvereins der deutschen Buchhändler, Leipzig 1925 (Leseprobe, books.google.col).

Further reading 
 
 Schulze, Friedrich. In : Verfasserlexikon zur Studenten- und Hochschulgeschichte. SH-Verlag, Cologne 2004, .

References

External links 
 
 
 

Directors of museums in Germany
German art historians
1881 deaths
1960 deaths
Writers from Weimar